{{Automatic taxobox
| image = Haematomyzus elephantis (9197687258).jpg
| image_caption = Haematomyzus elephantis
| display_parents = 5
| taxon = Haematomyzus
| authority = Piaget, 1869<ref name="Piaget, 1869">{{cite journal |last1=Piaget |first1=E. |title=Description d'un parasite de l'elephant, Haematomyzus elephantis |journal=Tijdschrift voor Entomologie |date=1869 |volume=12 |pages=249–254 |url=https://www.biodiversitylibrary.org/page/10854712}}</ref>
| parent_authority=Enderlein, 1904
| grandparent_authority=Ferris, 1931
| subdivision_ranks = Species
| subdivision = 
| type_species=Haematomyzus elephantis
| type_species_authority=Piaget, 1869
| synonyms=
| synonyms_ref=
}}

The genus Haematomyzus includes three species of lice that differ so markedly from all other lice that the genus is placed in its own family Haematomyzidae, itself monotypic within the superfamily Rhynchophthirina'''. These unusual lice are ectoparasites of elephants and warthogs. Their mouthparts are elongated to form a drill-like structure that allows them to penetrate the thick skin of their host.

Taxonomy
The three species, Haematomyzus elephantis (elephant louse), Haematomyzus hopkinsi (warthog louse) and Haematomyzus porci (red river hog louse) belong to a single family, the Haematomyzidae, itself the only family within Rhynchophthirina.

 Host records H. elephantis is known from both the African and Asian Elephant.

 Notes 
The first spelling of "Rhyncophthirina" by Ferris was a lapse, and in subsequent use of the term he spelled it "Rhynchophthirina" adding the second "h". Ordinal names are not covered by the International Code of Nomenclature and thus the name and spelling comes down to a matter of personal preference. The majority of phthirapterists spell the suborder as "Rhynchophthirina" as did Hopkins and Clay, 1952, and Price et al.'', 2003.

References

References 
 
 

Lice
Insect genera
Insects of Africa
Insects of Asia